I Can Get It for You Wholesale: Original Broadway Cast Recording contains the songs from the Broadway musical I Can Get It for You Wholesale, with music and lyrics by Harold Rome. The album contains Barbra Streisand's show-stopping solo
"Miss Marmelstein", which became the most memorable song of the show.

Background
Barbra Streisand's vocals are featured in the songs "I'm Not A Well Man", "Ballard Of The Garment Trade", "Miss Marmelstein" and "What Are They Doing To Us Now?". This album marks her first professional recording appearance. Goddard Lieberson, who produced the album, signed Streisand to a contract, and her first solo album The Barbra Streisand Album was released two months after I Can Get It for You Wholesale closed.

Track listing
All songs written by Harold Rome.
"Overture" – 1:27
"I'm Not A Well Man" (performed by Barbra Streisand and Jack Kruschen) – 2:21
"The Way Things Are" (performed by Elliott Gould) – 1:41
"When Gemini Meets Capricorn" (performed by Marilyn Cooper and Elliott Gould) – 2:48
"Momma, Momma, Momma" (performed by Elliott Gould and Lillian Roth) – 2:57
"The Sound Of Money" (performed by Elliott Gould and Sheree North) – 4:15
"Too Soon" (performed by Lillian Roth) – 3:05
"The Family Way" (performed by Elliott Gould, Lillian Roth, Marilyn Cooper, Ken LeRoy and Bambi Linn) – 3:08
"Who Knows?" (performed by Marilyn Cooper) – 3:41
"Ballad Of The Garment Trade" (performed by Barbra Streisand, Elliott Gould, Marilyn Cooper, Ken LeRoy and Bambi Linn) – 3:25
"Have I Told You Lately?" (performed by Ken LeRoy and Bambi Linn) – 3:10
"A Gift Today" (performed by Elliott Gould, Lillian Roth, Marilyn Cooper, Ken LeRoy and Bambi Linn) – 3:55
"Miss Marmelstein" (performed by Barbra Streisand) – 3:22
"A Funny Thing Happened" (performed by Elliott Gould and Marilyn Cooper) – 2:38
"What's In It For Me?" (performed by Harold Lang) – 1:57
"Eat A Little Something" (performed by Elliott Gould and Lillian Roth ) – 2:10
"What Are They Doing To Us Now?" (performed by Barbra Streisand) – 7:11

Unrecorded tracks
The following songs from the musical show were not included in the cast recording:
 "Overture" (This unrecorded overture is a medley typical of the standard Broadway musical. The recorded track titled "Overture" is actually a brief musical accompaniment to a piece of dance and movement that opens the first scene.)
 "The Sound Of Money (Reprise)" (Harold Rome)
 "Epilogue" (Harold Rome)

Singles

The songs "Miss Marmelstein" (performed by Barbra Streisand) and "Who Knows?" (performed by Marilyn Cooper) were released to radio as a promotional single in April 1962.

Chart performance
The album peaked at #125 on Billboard's Pop Albums Chart.

Personnel
Produced by Goddard Lieberson
Music and lyrics by Harold Rome
Musical direction and vocal arrangements by Lehman Engel
Orchestrations by Sid Ramin
Original recording engineers: Fred Plaut and Ed Michalski

References

1962 albums
Columbia Records albums
Cast recordings
Albums produced by Goddard Lieberson